Wuttagoonaspis is a genus of primitive arthrodire placoderms from Middle Devonian Australia.  The box-like skull is up to 18 centimeters in length, and the median dorsal plate averages in length about 10 centimeters.

References

Placoderms of Australia
Wuttagoonaspidae